Carl Gustav Magnusson (born March 8, 1940) is an industrial designer, inventor, design juror and lecturer.

Life and career
Carl Gustav Magnusson was born in Malmö, Sweden and grew up in Toronto, Ontario and Vancouver, British Columbia in Canada. He studied engineering and architecture at the University of Idaho and architecture at the Chalmers Institute of Technology in Gothenburg, Sweden. In 1966 he joined the Office of Charles and Ray Eames in California and shortly thereafter opened his own design practice in Rudolf Schindler's studio on Kings Road in West Hollywood, California.

Knoll
In 1976 Magnusson joined Knoll as Director of Graphics and Showroom Design and was named Director of Design for Europe shortly thereafter. He designed Knoll showrooms in London, Frankfurt, Stuttgart, Zurich, Florence, Rome, Amsterdam and Turin. In 1993, he was named Senior Vice President, Director of Design Worldwide, and, in 2003, Executive Vice President, Director of Design.

As a design director, Magnusson widened the range of designers that Knoll commissioned work from—recruiting both established and younger talents. In the late 1980s, Magnusson rekindled Knoll's relationship with renowned designer and esthetic theorist, Ettore Sottass, which led to numerous iconic  pieces, including the Mandarin chair and the Spyder table. Sculptor Maya Lin collaborated closely with Magnusson in 1998  to create Knoll's Maya Lin line of furniture that Knoll continues to sell today. Similarly, architect Frank Gehry worked with Knoll to create Knoll's Fog Collection.  Magnusson continued to contribute his own designs to Knoll as well, including the Magnusson Desk (1993), the RPM Chair (1997), and modular office systems—Dividends, with David Noel; Currents, with Robert Reuter; and Autostrada, with Robert Reuter and Charlie Rozier.

During his 29 years at Knoll, Magnusson was also active as a curator and educator. He established the Knoll Design Symposium at Cranbrook Academy of the Arts in Bloomfield Hills and in 1997; he co-founded with Albert Pfeiffer (AIA) The Knoll Museum in East Greenville, Pennsylvania. With over 60 years of Knoll furniture designs, the museum is considered among the most comprehensive display of archival collector items by any furniture manufacturer.

Ongoing Activities
Since retiring from Knoll in 2005, Magnusson has remained active as a designer, consultant and lecturer. Today he continues in the fields of office design and environment, as well as lighting systems, automobiles, and household appliances, furnishings and textiles. In addition to Knoll, he has designed products for Teknion, Stegner Engineering, Arexit, Momentum Textiles, Allseating, and the MoMA Design Store (co-designed with his wife, architect Emanuela Frattini Magnusson). In 2005, Magnusson founded CGM Design which serves furniture and automotive manufacturers in product development and design strategy.

He has lectured on design matters for BMW, Knoll, Maharam, AIA and Waterworks, IIDA, SCAD among others, is a frequent jury member for design competitions internationally and expert witness on design matters.

In 2012, the design industry publication Contract named him the 2012 design "legend" of the year, saying of him: "he is an industrial designer, as well as a curator, lecturer, mentor, inventor, organizer, talent scout, and visionary. And his influence has spread out in multiple directions around the globe."

Design Awards
 Architizer, 2017 - Ivy Umbrella Stand (created 1990 with Emanuela Frattini Magnusson
 Contract Magazine Legend Award, 2012 
 MAST Monitor Arm System for Teknion: Chicago Atheneum Good Design Award
 A-Fold: iF Product Design Award
 Conflux Lighting: Green Good Design AwardIIDEX Gold Award,Neocon Gold Award for LightingiF Design Award,Building Magazine: Grand Award for Innovation; Innovation Award Lighting for energy efficiency 
 Synapse Chair: NeoCon GoldGreen Star Sustainability AwardGood Design AwardBloom Award for Furniture (ASID and Interiors and Sources) 
 IIDEX/Neocon Marketplace: Innovation Gold Awardthe iF Design Award 
 Pacific Design Center Lifetime Achievement Award
The GOOD DESIGN Award 2017 for Lyss, designed for Allseating
Interior Design Best of Year Awards - Merit Honoree for Lyss, designed for Allseating
IDEA Awards, Bronze for Lyss, designed for Allseating
The GOOD DESIGN Award 2018 for Zinc, designed for Allseating

Quotes
"Design is function with cultural content. When function has evaporated all thats left is cultural content"

"Everything that I do has a certain mechanical logic to it, and follows my definition of design--which is function with cultural content."

"Innovation is a unique combination of existing ideas."

"Cultural content imbues the item with our history, our inescapable style of our time and its values. Yet, a designed object must meet the functional and manufacturing cost requirements that allow customers to afford it. If the price is prohibitive then what function does it perform?"

 "Dont fall into the Veblen effect"

See also
Industrial design

External links
 Designers & Books
 Contract Legend Award, 2012
 Fast Company, 2010
 Classic Driver, 2010
 Classic Driver, 2009

Notes

Living people
1940 births
Swedish designers
Chalmers University of Technology alumni
Swedish emigrants to Canada
University of Idaho alumni